The Senate of Puerto Rico is the upper house of the Legislative Assembly of Puerto Rico, the territorial legislature of Puerto Rico. The Senate, together with the House of Representatives of Puerto Rico, control the legislative branch of the government of Puerto Rico.

The structure and responsibilities of the Senate are defined in Article III of the Constitution of Puerto Rico which vests all legislative power in the Legislative Assembly. Every bill must be passed by both, the Senate and the House, and signed by the Governor of Puerto Rico in order to become law.

The Senate has exclusive power to try and to decide impeachments. The constitution also establishes that all secretaries appointed by the governor to the different executive departments, as well as all judges and the Comptroller, require the advice and consent of the Senate. Justices of the Supreme Court can not assume office until after confirmation by the Senate.

The Senate has 27 members. Sixteen are elected from senatorial districts, with two senators per district, while an additional 11 which are elected at-large.

The Senate has been meeting since 1917, after the enactment of the Jones–Shafroth Act established the body formally. The current session is the 27th Senate of Puerto Rico which has a majority from the Popular Democratic Party of Puerto Rico; giving the party control over the Senate without political opposition including constitutional amendments.

The Senate, along with its members and staff, are housed in the eastern half of the Capitol of Puerto Rico. These buildings are usually the Rafael Martínez Nadal Senate Annex Building, the Luis Muñoz Marín Office Building, the Antonio R. Barceló Building, the Luis A. Ferré Building, the Ramón Mellado Parsons Office Building and the Baltasar Corrada del Rio Office Building.

History

The Senate of Puerto Rico was established in 1917, after the signing of the Jones Act. Signed on March 2, 1917, the act made Puerto Ricans into U.S. citizens and empowered them to have a popularly elected Senate. This came to amend and improve the Foraker Act, signed in 1900, which granted limited administrative and executive powers to Puerto Ricans.

From 1900 to 1917, Puerto Ricans made several attempts to convince the United States into amending the Foraker Act, so they could elect their own Senate. In February 1914, Resident Commissioner of Puerto Rico, Luis Muñoz Rivera presented legislation in Congress insisting in the creation of a Puerto Rican Senate with more powers. Finally, in January 1916, Representative William Jones presented the Jones Act for Puerto Rico and other territories. It was signed by Woodrow Wilson on March 2, 1917.

On August 13, 1917, the first Senate of Puerto Rico was sworn in. Antonio R. Barceló was chosen as its first President, with Eduardo Georgetti as his Pro tempore. Also, José Muñoz Rivera and Manuel Palacios Salazar were selected as Secretary and Sergeant at Arms respectively. In this first instance, the Senate was composed of 19 members, 14 of which were chosen from each of the seven senatorial districts, and five elected at-large.

Functions
The Senate, along with the House of Representatives, are in charge of the legislative power of the Government of Puerto Rico.

The Senate has exclusive power to try and to decide impeachment cases, and in meeting for such purposes, the Senators act in the name of the people of Puerto Rico. The Constitution also establishes that all Secretaries appointed by the Governor to the different executive departments, as well as all judges, require the advice and consent of the Senate. Justices of the Supreme Court can not assume office until after confirmation by the Senate.

Commissions

 Agriculture
 Banking, Consumer Affairs, and Public Corporations
 Civil Legal
 Commerce and Cooperativism
 Criminal Justice
 Government
 Economic Development and Planning
 Education and Family Matters
 Federal Relations and Informatics
 Health
 Internal Affairs
 Labor, Veterans' Affairs, and Human Resources

 Mountain
 Municipal Matters
 Natural and Environmental Resources
 Public Safety and Judiciary Matters
 Recreation and Sports
 Rules and Calendar
 Social Welfare
 Tourism and Culture
 Treasury
 Urbanism and Infrastructure
 Western Development
 Women's Affairs

Membership

Qualifications
Article III of the Constitution of Puerto Rico states that no person can be a member of the Senate unless the candidate:
 is capable of reading and writing in either Spanish or English;
 is a citizen of the United States and Puerto Rico;
 has resided in Puerto Rico for at least two years immediately prior to the date of his election or appointment;
 is over thirty years of age.

Elections

Elections to the Senate are held every four years on the Tuesday after the first Monday of November, along with the elections for governor, resident commissioner, the House, the mayors, and the municipal assemblies. The last election was held on November 8, 2016, where the members of the 26th Senate of Puerto Rico were elected. The next election is scheduled for November 3, 2020 where the members of the 27th Senate of Puerto Rico will be elected. Members of the Senate are elected for a four-year term. Tony Fas Alzamora is the most senior and longest-serving senator, having served for nine consecutive terms since 1981 for a total of  years.

Only American citizens (including Puerto Ricans) that meet all the following requirements may vote for senators:

 must legally reside in Puerto Rico,
 must be at least 18 years old by the date of the election,
 must have been qualified by the Puerto Rico State Commission on Elections before the election or on the very same day of the election after he presents himself to his nearest place of voting and shows proper documentation, and
 must have not been declared mentally incapacitated by court.

Citizens cast their votes in colleges which are simply usually the nearest public school to where the voter declared as residence. Votes are required by law to be cast in secret, unless the citizen has a physical impairment that does not allow him to. Those citizens unable to travel to colleges due to medical impairments may vote at their place of residence (homes, elder homes, etc.) or wherever they are convalescing (hospitals, clinics, etc.). In both of these extraordinary cases, officials from the Puerto Rico State Commission on Elections will provide aid so that the citizens can cast their vote—either by using verbal or non-verbal communication—with members from the different political parties required to observe the process in order to ensure accuracy, fairness, transparency, order, and legitimacy.

Ballots are redacted in both Spanish and English, regardless of whether English is an official language or not.

To elect the members of the Senate, Puerto Rico is divided into eight senatorial districts, each based on a similar number of inhabitants:

These districts are in turn divided into one or more precincts: electoral divisions which are in turn divided into the aforementioned colleges. For each district, citizens may vote only for the district in which they have declared their residence, and only for two candidates per district by plurality-at-large. The two candidates with the highest votes in the respective district serve as senators for that specific district. District senators are expected to give priority to matters related to the district they represent but are not required to do so by law.

In addition, citizens are allowed to vote for one candidate at-large of their preference by single non-transferable vote. The eleven at-large candidates with the most votes serve as senators at-large alongside the district senators with the same powers and rights. Senators at-large are expected to serve any individual or group but are not required to do so by law; they also serve as a mechanism for citizens who do not wish to channel their affairs through their district senator for whatever reason.

Term
Senators serve terms of four years each. A member who has been elected, but not yet seated, is called a "senator-elect"; a member who has been appointed to a seat, but not yet seated, is called a "senator-designate".  The Puerto Rico Constitution does not provide for term limits and, in fact, one current senator is completing his ninth four-year term as a senator and his tenth as a legislator.

Salary and benefits
The annual salary for full-time work of each senator is US$73,775 annually, except for the President of the Senate which receives $110,663, and the President pro tempore, the Majority and Minority Leaders, the Majority and Minority Whips, and the presidents of the Commission on Government and the Commission on Treasury which receive $84,841 each.

Senators are allowed to generate additional income from outside their legislative employment subject to restrictions, and only the senators which do not receive an annual salary are entitled to additional benefits such as per diem or car allowance. Costs associated to traveling outside of Puerto Rico is reimbursed. Cost-of-living adjustments have been frozen since 2005. All senators qualify for the same retirement and health benefits as of all other employees of the government of Puerto Rico.

In addition, all senators are provided with office space, secretarial services, advisors, support personnel, office supplies, and stationery. Hiring of personnel working directly for each senator is at the discretion of each senator. Rather than providing these resources and services directly, senators are instead assigned a budget from which they retrieve funds to pay for these. Senators that preside commissions are assigned larger budgets than those who don't; creating a difference between the budgets assigned to senators from the party holding a majority in the Senate versus the ones in minority as majority senators tend to be the ones that preside commissions.

Majority and minority parties

The "Majority party" is the political party that has a majority of seats. The next-largest party is known as the minority party. The president pro tempore, committee chairs, and some other officials are generally from the majority party.

Whenever the elected members of the minority constitute less than nine members, the Constitution provides for the certification of additional "add-on" minority Senators, who will serve in an at-large capacity.  Such was the case after the 2004 elections, when four defeated Popular Democratic Party (PPD) Senate candidates, one at-large, and three district candidates, were added on as at-large Senators, joining the five PPD Senators who had achieved election in their own right.  This constitutional guarantee of a minimum legislative minority representation is unique to Puerto Rico among all legislatures under the American flag, incorporating an element of proportionality usually found only in proportional representation bodies.

Officers
The Senate is served by several officers with and without voting powers, which are elected from within and outside its ranks. Of these, only the president was established by the Constitution; all other officers were established by internal rules adopted by the Senate. Only the president and president pro tempore have voting powers as all are elected from within. Non-voting officers are elected from outside Senate ranks and simply assist in internal procedures and clerical tasks, and in the observance of internal rules, laws, and the Constitution. Typical non-voting officers include the secretary, the sergeant-at-arms, and other officers appointed by the different commissions as part of their own internal affairs.

President of the Senate

The president is the highest-ranking officer and the presiding officer of the Senate. The post was created by Article III of the Constitution of Puerto Rico which establishes that, "The Senate shall elect a President [...] from among [its] members." The president is substituted by the president pro tempore in his absence. Its counterpart in the House is the speaker.

The current president is José Luis Dalmau, senator at-large from the Popular Democratic Party of Puerto Rico.

President pro tempore

The president pro tempore is the second highest-ranking officer of the Senate and substitutes the president of the House in his absence. Its counterpart in the House is the speaker pro tempore.

The current president pro tempore is Marially González Huertas, senator for District V Ponce from the Popular Democratic Party.

Party leaders
Each party elects floor leaders denominated "majority leader" or "minority leader", accordingly, as well as a "majority whip" or a "minority whip". Floor leaders act as the party chief spokespeople. The current leaders are Majority Leader Javier Aponte Dalmau, Majority Whip Gretchen Hau; Minority Leader Thomas Rivera Schatz, Minority Whip Carmelo Ríos Santiago; Minority Leader María de Lourdes Santiago; Minority Leader Ana Irma Rivera Lassén; Minority Leader Joan Rodríguez Vevé; and Minority Leader Vargas Vidot (independent candidate).

Non-member officers

The Senate is served by two elected officials who are not members.

The Senate's chief legislative officer is the secretary of the Senate, who maintains public records, disburses salaries, monitors the acquisition of stationery and supplies, and oversees clerks.

The other official is the sergeant-at-arms who, as the Senate's chief law enforcement officer, maintains order and security on the Senate floor and other premises.

These officers are elected by the Senate, usually during its inaugural session, immediately after the election of the body's president. The current secretary is Yamil Rivera Vélez while the current sergeant-at-arms is Javier Torres.

Current composition

The current session is the 27th Senate of Puerto Rico, the upper house of the 19th Legislative Assembly of Puerto Rico, which will meet from January 2, 2021, to January 1, 2025. All members were elected in the general elections of 2020 with a plurality or relative majority coming from the Popular Democratic Party. The other major party, the New Progressive Party resulted with the second largest number of seats. For the first time ever, five different political parties were represented, including the two major parties, in addition to one independent candidate. The Puerto Rican Independence Party elected its traditional member At-large and the two emergent parties, Movimiento Victoria Ciudadana and Proyecto Dignidad, also elected their At-large nominees.

Other organizations

The Office of Legislative Services was headed in early 2009 by Kevin Rivera, while Eliezer Velázquez currently serves as Superintendent of the Capitol, the first to serve during two four-year terms.

The Puerto Rico Legislative Assembly also receives support services from the Council of State Governments (CSG), CSG's Eastern Regional Conference, the National Conference of State Legislatures (NCSL) and the National Hispanic Caucus of State Legislators (NHCSL).

Past composition of the Senate

See also
 List of former members of the Senate of Puerto Rico

Notes

References

External links
  
 The Office of Legislative Services / Oficina de Servicios Legislativos 
 The Office of Legislative Services / Oficina de Servicios Legislativos 

 
Legislative Assembly of Puerto Rico
Puerto Rico
1917 establishments in Puerto Rico